The Tour de Hongrie is a professional road bicycle stage race organized in Hungary since 1925.

History
The inaugural Tour de Hongrie took place on 27 June 1925. The cyclists hit the road as early as four in the morning, and the Budapest–Szombathely–Győr-Budapest stage was accomplished the quickest by Károly Jerzsabek, who managed to cover the distance of 510.5 kilometres in 22 hours and 10 minutes to become the first ever champion of the event.

The race was held until the World War II in every year, except 1928, when Budapest hosted the UCI Road World Championship and 1936, when cyclist were in the middle of the preparation of the Olympic Games. During the World War, the event was held twice on a shortened distance, however, following the political changes in the country it was staged only occasionally. Moreover, between 1964 and 1992 came a near thirty years intermission, when the competition was not held.

After the end of the communism in Hungary, the Tour the Hongrie was organized again by the Hungarian Cycling Federation from 1993, and was held until 2008 with only shorter interruptions. In 2007 the field of the tour left the actual borders of the country for the first time, when the third stage of the race began in Sátoraljaújhely and ended in Košice, Slovakia. Up to the present, the 2008 edition was the last fixture of the event, after that the Hungarian stages have been integrated to another competition, the Central European Tour.

Winners

Winners by nation
A complete list over overall winners by nation of the Tour de Hongrie.

Classifications
As of the 2018 edition, the jerseys worn by the leaders of the individual classifications are:
  Yellow Jersey – Worn by the leader of the general classification.
  Green Jersey – Worn by the leader of the points classification.
  Red Jersey – Worn by the leader of the climbing classification.
  White Jersey – Worn by the best Hungarian rider of the overall classification.

References

External links

 
 ProCyclingStats

 
UCI Europe Tour races
Recurring sporting events established in 1925
Cycle races in Hungary
May sporting events
1925 establishments in Hungary